A magnet is an object that has a magnetic field.

Magnet or magnets may also refer to:

Places
 Magnet, Allier, a town in France
 Magnet, California, an unincorporated community in Madera County
 Magnet, Illinois, an unincorporated community in Coles County
 Magnet, Indiana, an unincorporated community in Perry County
 Magnet, Nebraska, a village in the United States
 Magnet, Texas, an unincorporated community in the United States

In music
 Magnet (musician) (born 1970), Norwegian singer-songwriter
 Magnet (band), a folk band
 The Magnets, a UK a cappella vocal group
 Magnet (album), a 2003 album by Robin Gibb
 Magnets (album), by The Vapors, or the title song
 "Magnets" (song), a 2015 song by Disclosure
 "Magnet", a song by Bikini Kill from Pussy Whipped
 "Magnet", a song by Bombay Bicycle Club from I Had the Blues But I Shook Them Loose
 Magnet (magazine), a music magazine
 Magnet Records, a record label
 "Magnet" (BGYO song), 2022

Other entertainment
 The Magnet, an early 20th-century British story paper
 The Magnet Theater, an improv theater
 Magnet Releasing, an independent theatrical films distributor
 Magnet (children's television block)

Other uses
 Magnet school, specialized public school
 Magnet Kitchens, a kitchen retailer based in the UK and Ireland
 Magnet Trade, a brand belonging to Magnet Kitchens
 Maritime Awareness Global Network, a US Coast Guard intelligence tool
 , more than one ship of the British Royal Navy
 , more than one ship of the United States Navy
 Magnet Networks, an internet, video and voice services provider in Ireland and the UK
 Magnet Recognition Program, a nursing recognition program
 Magnet URI scheme, a scheme for Uniform Resource Identifiers, often used with peer-to-peer networks

See also
 Magnit, Russian food retailer
 Misspelling of Magnate